On May 14, 1607,  104 English men and boys established the Jamestown Settlement for the Virginia Company, on a slender peninsula on the bank of the Jamestown River. It became the first long-term English settlement in North America.

The settlement was built on the banks of Virginia's James River. The trips aboard the ships Susan Constant, Discovery, and the Godspeed, and the settlement itself, were sponsored by the Virginia Company of London, whose stockholders hoped to make a profit from the resources of the New World. The community suffered terrible hardships in its early years, including starvation leading to cannibalism and Indian attacks, and many hundreds died. With resupply and additional immigrants, it managed to endure, becoming America's first permanent English colony.

The site for Jamestown was picked based on criteria set by the Virginia Company. The site was surrounded by water on three sides (it later became an island) and was distant from the sea, making it more easily defensible against possible Spanish attacks. The water was also deep enough that the English could tie their ships at the shoreline. The site was also not inhabited by the native population.

Once the settlement location was chosen, the company members opened the Virginia Company's sealed instructions containing the list of the previously chosen council members. Each ship had sailed with a box containing the same set of instructions. The first president was Edward Maria Winfield. The other six council members were Bartholomew Gosnold, Christopher Newport, John Martin, John Ratcliffe, George Kendall, a

The settlers arrived on three ships, the Susan Constant, the Godspeed, and the Discovery.

 Jeremy Alicock, Gentleman, (d. August 14, 1607)
 Captain Gabriell Archer, Gentleman, died Winter 1609-1610
 John Asbie, (d. August 6, 1607)
 Robert Behethland, Gentleman, (d. 1689)
 Benjamin Best, Gentleman, (d. September 5, 1607)
 Thomas Bragg, Teenaged Deckhand to Christopher Newport
 George Bragg, Teenaged Deckhand to Christopher Newport
 Edward Brinto, Mason, Soldier
 James Brumfield, Boy
 Edward Brookes, Gentleman, (d. April 7, 1607)
 John Brookes, Gentleman
 Edward Browne, Gentleman, (d. August 15, 1607)
 William Bruster, Gentleman, (d. August 10, 1607)
 John Capper, Carpenter
 George Cassen, Labourer, (d. December 1607)
 Thomas Cassen, Labourer
 William Cassen, Labourer
 Ustis Clovill, Gentleman, (alternate Eustice) (d. June 7, 1607)
 Samuell Collier, Boy, (d. 1622)
 Roger Cooke, Gentleman
 Thomas Couper, Barber
 Richard Crofts, Gentleman
 Richard Dixon, Gentleman
 John Dods, Labourer, Soldier
 Ould Edward, Labourer
 Thomas Emry, Carpenter, (d. December 1607)
 Robert Fenton, Gentleman
 George Flowre, Gentleman, (d. August 9, 1607)
 Robert Ford, Gentleman
 Richard Frith, Gentleman
 Stephen Galthrope (or Halthrop), Gentleman, (d. August 15, 1607)
 William Garrett, Bricklayer
 George Golding, Labourer
 Thomas Gore, Gentleman, (d. August 16, 1607)
 Anthony Gosnold, Gentleman, (d. January 7, 1609)
 Captain Bartholomew Gosnold, Captain of the Godspeed, Council Member, (d. August 22, 1607)
 Edward Harrington, Gentleman (d. August 24, 1607)
 John Herd, Bricklayer
 Nicholas Houlgrave, Gentleman
 Master Robert Hunt (chaplain), Preacher, (d. before 1609)
 Thomas Jacob, Sergeant, (d. September 4, 1607)
 William Johnson, Labourer
 Captain George Kendall, Council Member, (d. December 1, 1607)
 Ellis Kingston (or Kiniston), Gentleman, (d. September 18, 1607)
 John Laydon, Carpenter
 William Laxon, Carpenter
 William Love, Tailor, Soldier
 John Martin, Jr, Gentleman, (d. August 18, 1607)
 Captain John Martin, Sr, Gentleman, Council Member (d. June 1632)
 George Martin, Gentleman
 Francis Midwinter, Gentleman, (d. August 14, 1607)
 Edward Morish (Morris), Gentleman, Corporal, (d. August 14, 1607)
 Matthew Morton, Sailor
 Thomas Mounslie, Laborer,(d. August 17, 1607)
 Thomas Mouton, Gentleman,(d. September 19, 1607)
 Richard Mutton, Boy
 Nathaniel Peacock, Boy
 Penington, Robert - Gentleman, (d. August 18, 1607)
 Master George Percy, Gentleman,(d. 1632)
 Dru Pickhouse, Gentleman,(d. August 19, 1607)
 Edward Pising, Carpenter
 Nathaniel Powell, Gentleman (d. March 22, 1622)
 Jonas Profit, Sailor, Fisherman
 Captain John Ratliffe, Captain of the Discovery, Council Member, (d. November 1609)
 James Read, Blacksmith, Soldier, (d. March 13, 1622)
 John Robinson, Gentleman, (d. December 1607)
 William Rods, Labourer, (d. August 27, 1607)
 Thomas Sands, Gentleman
 Edward Short, Labourer, (d. August 1607)
 John Short, Gentleman
 Richard Simons, Gentleman, (d. September 18, 1607)
 Nicholas Scot (or Skot), Drummer
 Robert Small, Carpenter
 Captain John Smith, Council Member, (d. June 1631)
 William Smethes, Gentleman
 Francis Snarsbrough, Gentleman
 John Stevenson, Gentleman
 Thomas Studley, Gentleman, (d. August 28, 1607)
 William Tanker, Gentleman
 Henry Tavin, Labourer
 Kellam Throgmorton, Gentleman, (d. August 26, 1607)
 Anas Todkill, Carpenter, Soldier
 William Unger, Labourer
 George Walker, Gentleman
 Thomas Walker, listed under "Virginia, Compiled Census and Census Substitutes Index, 1607-1890"
 John Waller (or Waler), Gentleman, (d. August 24, 1607)
 Thomas Webbe, Gentleman
 William White, Laborer
 William Wilkinson, Surgeon
 Master Edward Maria Wingfield, Captain of the Susan Constant, Council President, (d. 1631)
 Thomas Wotton, Surgeon, (d. April 28, 1638)
 Richard (commoner) 

Mariners and others known to have been with the expedition:

 Browne, Oliver - Mariner
 Clarke, Charles - Mariner
  (or Cotson), John - Mariner
 Crookdeck, John - Mariner
 Deale, Jeremy - Mariner
 Fitch, Mathew - Mariner - died July 1609
 Genoway, Richard - Mariner
 Godword, Thomas - Mariner
 Jackson, Robert - Mariner
 Markham, Robert - Mariner
 Nelson, Francys - Captain - died Winter 1612-1613
 Poole, Jonas - Mariner - died 1612
 Skynner, Thomas - Mariner
 Turnbrydge (or Turbridge), Thomas - Mariner
 Newport, Christopher - Captain, Councilor - died 1617
 Tyndall, Robert - Mariner, Gunner
 White, Benjamyn - Mariner
 Danynell
 Stephen

First Supply -- January 1608 

 Jefrey Abots, Gentleman
 Robert Alberton, Perfumer
 Robert Barnes, Gentleman
 William Bayley, Gentleman
 William Beckwith, Tailer
 Richard Belfield, Refiner
 William Bentley, Labourer
 John Bouth, Labourer
 Richard Brislow, Labourer
 William Burket, Labourer
 James Burne
 William Cantril, Gentleman
 William Causey, Gentleman
 Thomas Coo, Gentleman
 Robert Cotton, Tobacco-pipe-maker
 Robert Cutler, Gentleman
 William Dawson, Refiner
 Richard Dole, Blacksmith
 Thomas Feld, Apothecary
 Richard Fetherstone
 George Forest, Gentleman
 Post Gittnat, Surgeon
 Raymond Goodyson, Labourer
 Richard Gradon, Labourer
 William Gryvill, Gentleman
 Edward Gurganay, Gentleman
 John Harford, Apothecary
 John Harper, Gentleman
 George Hill, Gentleman
 Thomas Hope, Tailer
 William Johnson, Refiner
 Peter Keffer, Gunner
 Richard Killingbeck, Gentleman
 Timothy Leds, Gentleman
 John Lewes, Cooper
 William May, Labourer
 Michaell
 Richard Miler, Labourer
 Richard Molynex, Gentleman
 Ralfe Morton, Gentleman
 Rowland Nelstrop, Labourer
 John Nickoles, Gentleman
 William Perce, Labourer
 Francis Perkins, Labourer
 Michaell Phetyplace, Gentleman
 William Phetyplace, Gentleman
 Peter Pory, Gentleman
 Richard Pots, Gentleman
 John Powell, Tailer
 George Pretty, Gentleman
 Richard Prodger, Gentleman
 Abraham Ransacke, Refiner
 Christopher Rode
 Doctor Russell, Gentleman
 Richard Salvage, Labourer
 Thomas Salvage, Labourer
 Matthew Scrivner, appointed to be of the Council
 Michaell Sickelmore, Gentleman
 William Simons, Labourer
 John Speareman, Labourer
 William Spence, Labourer
 Daniell Stalling, Jeweller
 John Taverner, Gentleman
 Laurence Towtales, Tailer
 Nicholas Ven, Labourer
 William Ward, Tailer
 James Watkins
 Vere
 Richard Worley, Gentleman
 Richard Wyffin, Gentleman
 Bishop Wyles, Labourer
 William Yonge, Tailer
 With divers others

Second Supply -- Fall 1608 

 Thomas Abbey, Gentleman 
 Gabriell Bedle, Gentleman
 John Bedle, Gentleman
 Henry Bell, Tradesmen                                                           
 Thomas Bradley, Tradesmen
 Anne Burras, maid to Mistress Forrest
 John Burras, Tradesmen
 George Burton, Gentleman
 Rawley Chroshaw, Gentleman
 John Clarke, Tradesmen
 Henry Collings, Gentleman
 John Dauxe, Gentleman
 Thomas Dowse, Laborer
 William Dowman, Gentleman
 David Ellis, Tradesmen
 Thomas Forrest, Gentleman
 Mistress Forrest
 Thomas Fox, Laborer
 Thomas Gipson, Tradesmen
 Thomas Graves, Gentleman
 John Gudderington, Gentleman
 Nicholas Hancock, Laborer
 Hardwin, Laborer
 Harmon Haryson, Gentleman
 Hellyard, Boy
 John Hoult, Gentleman
 David ap Hugh, Tradesmen
 Master Hunt, Gentleman
 Thomas Lavander, Tradesmen
 Henry Ley, Gentleman
 Michaell Lowicke, Gentleman
 Thomas Mallard, Laborer
 Thomas Maxes, Gentleman
 Milman, Boy
 Morrell, Laborer
 Thomas Norton, Gentleman
 Dionis Oconor, Tradesmen
 Thomas Phelps, Tradesmen
 Henry Philpot, Gentleman
 Master Powell, Tradesmen
 John Prat, Tradesmen
 Rose, Laborer
 John Russell, Gentleman
 William Russell, Gentleman
 William Sambage, Gentleman
 Scot, Laborer
 Jefry Shortridge, Tradesmen
 William Taler, Laborer
 Daniell Tucker, Gentleman
 Williams, Laborer
 Captain Peter Winne, appointed to the Council
 Captain Richard Waldo, appointed to the Council
 Walker, Laborer
 Master Francis West, Gentleman
 Hugh Wollystone, Gentleman
 Hugh Wynne, Tradesmen
 George Yarington, Gentleman
 Eight Dutch men and Poles, known as the Jamestown Polish craftsmen, with some others

Additional  reading 

 Bernard powatancock The Barbarous Years: The Peopling of British North America: The Conflict of Civilizations, 1600-1675 (Vintage, 2012)
 Warren M. Billings (Editor), The Old Dominion in the Seventeenth Century: A Documentary History of Virginia, 1606-1700 (University of North Carolina Press, 2007)
 James Horn, A Land as God Made It (Perseus Books, 2005)
 Margaret Huber, Powhatan Lords of Life and Death: Command and Consent in Seventeenth-Century Virginia (University of Nebraska Press, 2008)
 William M. Kelso, Jamestown, The Buried Truth (University of Virginia Press, 2006)
 David A. Price, Love and Hate in Jamestown (Alfred A. Knopf, 2003)
 Helen C. Rountree, The Powhatan Indians of Virginia: Their Traditional Culture (University of Oklahoma Press, 2013)
 Ed Southern (Editor), Jamestown Adventure, The: Accounts of the Virginia Colony, 1605-1614 (Blair, 2011)
 Tony Williams, "The Jamestown Experiment: The Remarkable Story of the Enterprising Colony and the Unexpected Results that Shaped America" (Sourcebooks Inc, 2011)
 Jocelyn R. Wingfield, Virginia's True Founder: Edward Maria Wingfield and His Times (Booksurge, 2007)
 Benjamin Woolley, Savage Kingdom: The True Story of Jamestown, 1607, and the Settlement of America (Harper Perennial, 2008)
 William M. Kelso, Nicholas M. Luccketti, Beverly A. Straube, The Jamestown Rediscovery Archaeology Project

See also 

 History of Jamestown, Virginia (1607–1699)
 Jamestown, Virginia

References 

Pre-statehood history of Virginia